Hoka! is a collection of science fiction  stories by American writers Poul Anderson and Gordon Dickson.  It was first published by Wallaby in 1983.  The stories originally appeared in the magazines Fantasy and Science Fiction and Analog Science Fiction and Fact.

Contents

 Prologue, by Poul Anderson and Gordon Dickson
 "Joy in Mudville"
 "Undiplomatic Immunity"
 "Full Pack"
 "The Napoleon Crime"
 Afterword, by Sandra Miesel

Reception
Algis Budrys praised the collection, saying "The whole thing is a delight and I commend it to you almost unreservedly."

References

Sources

External links 
 

1983 short story collections
Short story collections by Poul Anderson
Short story collections by Gordon R. Dickson
Books with cover art by Michael Whelan